This is a list of prisons in Jiangsu.

Sources
 

Buildings and structures in Jiangsu
Jiangsu